Viskyar Mountain is a minor range of hills in western Bulgaria rising to 1077 m (Mechi Kamak Peak), and bounded by Lyulin Mountain to the southeast, Sofia Valley to the northeast, Zavalska Mountain to the northwest, and Graovo Valley to the southwest.  It is separated from the Lyulin and Zavalska hills by Raduyska Saddle and Yaroslavska Saddle, respectively.  The Saints Peter and Paul Monastery situated on the northern slopes of Viskyar is a popular tourist destination.

Honour
Viskyar Ridge on Greenwich Island in the South Shetland Islands, Antarctica is named after Viskyar Mountain.

References
In Viskyar Mountain (in Bulgarian)

Mountain ranges of Bulgaria
Landforms of Sofia City Province